Sheniqua Ferguson (born 24 November 1989) is a Bahamian sprinter who specializes in the 100 and 200 metres. She was born in Nassau.  She was part of the Bahamian team that won silver in the women's 4 x 100 m at the 2009 World Championships.  She was the 2008 Junior World Champion in the 200 m, and also won bronze in the 100 m that year.  She competed in the 200m at the 2008 Summer Olympics.  At the 2012 Olympics, she competed in the 100 m and the 4 x 100 m relay.  She competed in the 100 m and the 4 x 100 m relay at the 2014 Commonwealth Games.  At the 2016 Olympics, she competed in the 200 m.

Her personal best times are 11.07 seconds in the 100 metres, achieved in 21 April 2012, and 22.64 seconds in the 200 metres, achieved in 7 April 2012 in Auburn. She is also the 2010 NCAA Indoor Champion at 200 meters and 3 time SEC champ while running for Auburn University. She was coached by Henry Rolle.

Achievements

References

External Links

1989 births
Living people
Sportspeople from Nassau, Bahamas
Bahamian female sprinters
Auburn Tigers women's track and field athletes
Olympic athletes of the Bahamas
Athletes (track and field) at the 2008 Summer Olympics
Athletes (track and field) at the 2012 Summer Olympics
Athletes (track and field) at the 2016 Summer Olympics
World Athletics Championships medalists
Athletes (track and field) at the 2014 Commonwealth Games
Commonwealth Games competitors for the Bahamas
Athletes (track and field) at the 2015 Pan American Games
Pan American Games competitors for the Bahamas
World Athletics Championships athletes for the Bahamas
Olympic female sprinters
World Athletics U20 Championships winners
Auburn University alumni